Barclay is an unincorporated community in Clear Lake and Williams townships, Sangamon County, Illinois, United States.

References

Unincorporated communities in Sangamon County, Illinois
Unincorporated communities in Illinois